Tiobly is a town in the far west of Ivory Coast, near the border with Liberia. It is a sub-prefecture of Toulépleu Department in Cavally Region, Montagnes District. Tiobly is approximately seven kilometres east and seven kilometres north of the border with Liberia. The sub-prefecture extends further west than any other sub-prefecture in the country.

Tiobly was a commune until March 2012, when it became one of 1126 communes nationwide that were abolished.

Notes

Sub-prefectures of Cavally Region
Former communes of Ivory Coast